John Somers Cocks, 1st Earl Somers (6 May 1760 – 5 January 1841), known as The Lord Somers  between 1806 and 1821, was a British peer and politician.

Background and education
Somers was the son of Charles Cocks, 1st Baron Somers, and Elizabeth, daughter of Richard Eliot. He was educated at Westminster and St Alban Hall, Oxford.

Political career
Somers sat as Member of Parliament for West Looe between 1782 and 1784, for Grampound between 1784 and 1790 and finally for Reigate between 1790 and 1806. The latter year he succeeded his father in the barony and entered the House of Lords. In 1817 he was appointed Lord Lieutenant of Herefordshire, a post he held until his death in 1841. In 1821 he was created Earl Somers and accorded additional style Viscount Eastnor, of Eastnor Castle in the County of Hereford, to be the courtesy style of the eldest son of the Earl.

Starting in the 1790s he had served with the Worcester Yeomen Cavalry.

Family
Lord Somers was twice married. He married as his first wife Margaret, daughter of Reverend Treadway Russell Nash, on 19 March 1785. They had three sons and one daughter. His eldest son, Edward Charles Cocks, a British Army officer, was killed at the Siege of Burgos in 1812 during the Peninsular War, greatly to the regret of the Duke of Wellington, who valued him highly.

After his first wife's death in February 1831, he married as his second wife his first cousin, Jane, daughter of James Cocks and widow of Reverend George Waddington, in 1834. They had no children. Somers died in January 1841, aged 80, and was succeeded in his titles by his second but eldest surviving son, John. The Countess Somers died in November 1868.

Notes

References
G. E. C., ed. Geoffrey F. White. The Complete Peerage. (London: St. Chaterine Press, 1953) Vol. XII, Part 1, p. 32.

1760 births
1841 deaths
People educated at Westminster School, London
Alumni of St Alban Hall, Oxford
1
Members of the Parliament of Great Britain for English constituencies
Members of the Parliament of Great Britain for constituencies in Cornwall
British MPs 1780–1784
British MPs 1784–1790
British MPs 1790–1796
British MPs 1796–1800
Members of the Parliament of the United Kingdom for English constituencies
UK MPs 1801–1802
UK MPs 1802–1806
Somers, E1
UK MPs who were granted peerages
Worcestershire Yeomanry officers
Lord-Lieutenants of Herefordshire
Peers of the United Kingdom created by George IV